The Keg of Nails is a traveling trophy continuously-awarded to the winner of the American college football rivalry game between the Cincinnati Bearcats and Louisville Cardinals. The rivalry has stretched over the span of four conferences from the Missouri Valley Conference, to Conference USA, and more recently in the Big East Conference, which in 2013 was renamed to the American Athletic Conference. It is believed to be the oldest rivalry for the Louisville football team and the second oldest for Cincinnati, only behind the annual game with the Miami RedHawks.

The rivalry went on hiatus following the 2013 season, as Louisville moved to the Atlantic Coast Conference on July 1, 2014. Cincinnati leads the series 30–23–1. Cincinnati in the interim was invited to the Big 12 conference and will join in 2023.

Series history
The series was played sporadically before becoming an annual match up from 1966 to 2013, with only a brief hiatus from 1992 to 1996. The match-up gained more significance with the growth of both programs into the 2000s, primarily with the success under coaches John L. Smith and Bobby Petrino for Louisville and Mark Dantonio, Brian Kelly, and Butch Jones for Cincinnati. Both programs would challenge for and win titles during their shared time in Conference USA and the Big East.

The trophy is a replica of a keg used to ship nails. The exchange is believed to have been initiated by fraternity chapters on the UC and U of L campuses, signifying that the winning players in the game were "tough as nails." The present keg is actually a replacement for the original award, which was misplaced by Louisville, lost during some construction of office facilities. It is adorned with the logos of both schools and the scores of the series games.

Notable games
November 8, 1997: Bearcat return specialist Tinker Keck would return two punts for touchdowns, tying the NCAA record at that time. Cincinnati would defeat Louisville 28-9.

November 28, 2003: The Cardinals came to Cincinnati in what would go down as a shootout on a snowy afternoon. The Bearcats and QB Gino Guidugli would overcome a 28-7 second quarter deficit and the team was ahead 40-35 with 2:20 remaining in the game. An impressive 54 yard touchdown pass by Stefan LeFors with 70 seconds left would be enough to help Louisville escape with a 43-40 victory. This was the final Keg of Nails game by Cincinnati head coach Rick Minter.

October 14, 2006:The Bearcats took an early lead in the game, but the No. 7 Cardinals led by head coach Bobby Petrino were able to score twice at the end of the half, including on a 1-yard pass by quarterback Brian Brohm, to take a 13-10 lead to halftime. Late in the fourth quarter, the Bearcats had a chance win with another pass in the endzone, however it was knocked down by Cardinal cornerback Gavin Smart to preserve the win. The Cardinals won 23-17 and continued their 15-game home winning streak.

November 14, 2008: The No. 22 Bearcats, searching for their first Keg of Nails victory in six seasons, came to Louisville to take on a struggling Cardinals team. Cincinnati quarterback Tony Pike exited the game with an injury in the fourth quarter. The former starter, replaced by Pike after breaking his leg, Dustin Grutza entered the game and led the game winning, seventy-two yard drive for the Bearcats to win the game 28–20. The Bearcats would go onto win their first Big East conference title.

December 5, 2013: In a prime time, Thursday night game the No. 16 Cardinals came into Nippert Stadium to play the No. 23 Bearcats. Teddy Bridgewater would have a fantastic game, in which he would lead Louisville to a 31–24 OT victory. 

December 17, 2022: The Keg was revived in the postseason for the 2022 Fenway Bowl. The resumption of the series gained further notoriety when then Louisville head coach Scott Satterfield was announced as the new head coach at Cincinnati after the departure of Luke Fickell. Louisville would go on to win 24-7.

Game results

Notes 

A 2022 Fenway Bowl

Wins by location

Wins by venue

See also 
 List of NCAA college football rivalry games

References

College football rivalry trophies in the United States
Cincinnati Bearcats football
Louisville Cardinals football